The General Aircraft GAL.55 was a 1940s British military training glider designed and built by General Aircraft Limited.

Development
The GAL.55 was a two-seat training glider to meet Air Ministry Specification TX.3/43. The requirement called for a glider to train transport glider pilots and the GAL.55 had side-by-side seating, a tricycle landing gear, split trailing edge flaps and dive brakes. Two gliders were built, the first flew in 1943 from Hanworth, the type flew well but they did not handle like the contemporary Hotspur and Horsa. Having no training value the type did not enter production.

Specifications

See also

References

Notes

Bibliography

1940s British military trainer aircraft
Glider aircraft
GAL.55
Aircraft first flown in 1943